Edward L. Dreyer (1940–2007) was an American historian known for his work and expertise on the history of China's Ming dynasty.

Early life and education
Dreyer was born in 1940 in San Diego. He earned his BA in history from Harvard University in 1961 and his Ph.D. from Harvard with a thesis on "The Emergence of Chu Yuan-chang, 1360–65." His thesis advisors were John Fairbank and Lien-sheng Yang.

Career
Dreyer spent most of his career as a professor of history at the University of Miami. He authored a number of books and papers on various aspects of the Ming state, including its formative years and its military and naval history, including a chapter, "Military origins of Ming China" in The Cambridge History of China (vol. 7, part 1). 

Dreyer was a leading global authority on the Battle of Lake Poyang and the expeditions of Zheng He.

Personal life
Dreyer was married to June Teufel Dreyer, a China expert at the University of Miami and president of the American Association for Chinese Studies (AACS).

References

Citations

Sources 

 Hermann Beck, "In Memoriam: Edward L. Dreyer". Perspectives on History, February 2008.

External links
Obituary at Perspectives on History, February 1, 2008

Historians of China
American sinologists
20th-century American historians
American military historians
American male non-fiction writers
University of Miami faculty
2007 deaths
1940 births
Harvard College alumni
Harvard Graduate School of Arts and Sciences alumni